Thrilling Youth is a 1926 American silent comedy film directed by Grover Jones and starring Billy West, Gloria Grey and Charles Clary.

Cast
 Billy West as Billy Davis 
 Gloria Grey as Mary Bryson 
 George Bunny as Billy's Father 
 Charles Clary as Thomas Bryson 
 John J. Richardson as Bryson's Secretary
 Span Kennedy as Detective 
 Joseph Smith as Vallman

References

Bibliography
 Munden, Kenneth White. The American Film Institute Catalog of Motion Pictures Produced in the United States, Part 1. University of California Press, 1997.

External links

1926 films
Silent American comedy films
Films directed by Grover Jones
American silent feature films
1920s English-language films
Rayart Pictures films
American black-and-white films
1926 comedy films
1920s American films